Ehinger is a surname. Notable people with the surname include:

Ambrosius Ehinger (ca. 1500–1533), German conquistador
Andreas Bischoff-Ehinger (1812–1875), Swiss entomologist
Parker Ehinger (born 1992), American football guard

See also 
Villa Ehinger (Münchenstein), Villa in Switzerland